Plateliai eldership is an eldership in Plungė District Municipality to the northwest from Plungė. The administrative center is Plateliai. The eldership includes Lake Plateliai.

Largest towns and villages 
Plateliai
Gintališkė
Šateikių Rūdaičiai
Dovainiai
Beržoras

Other villages

References 

Elderships in Plungė District Municipality